Kōkako  (Callaeas) are two species of endangered forest birds which are endemic to New Zealand, the North Island kōkako (Callaeas wilsoni) and the presumably extinct South Island kōkako (Callaeas cinereus). They are both slate-grey with wattles and have black masks. They belong to a genus containing five known species of New Zealand wattlebird, the other three being two species of tieke (saddleback) and the extinct huia. Previously widespread, kōkako populations throughout New Zealand have been decimated by the predations of mammalian invasive species such as possums, stoats, cats and rats, and their range has contracted significantly. In the past this bird was called the New Zealand crow; however, it is not a crow at all, but it looks like one from a distance.

The spelling kokako (without a macron) is common in New Zealand English.

Taxonomy
The kōkako appears to be a remnant of an early expansion of passerines in New Zealand and is one of five species of New Zealand wattlebirds of the family Callaeidae, the others being two species of endangered tieke, or saddleback, and the extinct huia. New Zealand wattlebirds have no close relatives apart from the stitchbird, and their taxonomic relationships to other birds remain to be determined.

Description 

The North Island kōkako, Callaeas wilsoni has blue wattles (although this colour develops with age: in the young of this bird they are actually coloured a light pink). The South Island kōkako, Callaeas cinereus, by contrast has largely orange wattles, with only a small patch of blue at the base.

Behaviour

The kōkako has a beautiful, clear, organ-like song. Its call can carry for kilometres. Breeding pairs sing together in a bell-like duet for up to an hour in the early morning. Different populations in different parts of the North Island (if any populations of the South Island kōkako remain they are at present unknown) have distinctly different songs.

The kōkako is a poor flier and seldom flies more than 100 metres. The wings of this species are relatively short and rounded. It prefers to hop and leap from branch to branch on its powerful grey legs. It does not fly so much as glide and when seen exhibiting this behaviour they will generally scramble up tall trees (frequently New Zealand podocarps such as rimu and matai) before gliding to others nearby. Its ecological niche has been compared to that of a flying squirrel. Its diet consists of leaves, fern fronds, flowers, fruit and invertebrates.

Kōkako and humans

In Māori and modern New Zealand culture

Māori myth refers to the kōkako in several stories. In one notable story, a kōkako gave Māui water as he fought the sun by filling its plump wattles with water and offering it to Māui to quench his thirst. Māui rewarded kōkako for its kindness by stretching its legs until they were lean, long and strong, so that kōkako could easily leap through the forest to find food.

The kōkako appears on the reverse side of the New Zealand $50 note.

See also 
 Birds of New Zealand
 Wattle

References

Further reading
Murphy S.A., Flux I.A. and Double M.C. (2006) Recent evolutionary history of New Zealand's North and South Island Kokako (Callaeas cinerea) inferred from mitochondrial DNA sequences. Emu 106: 41–48.

External links 

 Database and map of potential South Island kōkako reports
 Kokako Recovery A website developed by private enthusiasts to promote the Kokako Recovery Programme
 
 Kōkako vocalizations (Xeno-canto)
 TerraNature page on wattlebirds
 Artworks featuring Kokako and
 Specimens of kōkako including albinos in the collection of the Museum of New Zealand Te Papa Tongarewa
 The role of 1080 poison in pest control for kōkako recovery
 Kokako Lost - The Last Days of the Great Barrier and Coromandel Crow A journal of 26 months of field research on kōkako in the southern Coromandel, by Sid Marsh

Callaeas
Birds of New Zealand